T. J. Shorts II (born October 15, 1997)  is a Macedonian-American basketball player who currently plays for the Telekom Baskets Bonn of Germany's Basketball Bundesliga. He played college basketball for UC Davis.

High school/College career 
Shorts starred for Tustin High School but received no Division I scholarship offers, so he opted to go the junior college route. He played two seasons at Saddleback College and averaged 20 points per game as a sophomore before transferring to UC Davis. On February 6, 2018, Shorts had 31 points, seven assists and four steals in a double overtime victory against Long Beach State after leading scorer Chima Moneke was suspended. In a game against victory at Cal Poly on February 15, he recorded a triple double with 10 points, 10 rebounds and 10 assists. As a junior, Shorts averaged 15.2 points, 4.3 assists and 2.0 steals per game. He shot .538 field goal percentage, ranking fifth in the Big West. At the conclusion of the regular season he was named Big West Player of the year and Newcomer of the year, the first player in conference history to receive both honors in the same season.

Professional career

Latvia (2019-2020) 
Following the close of his college career, Shorts signed with Ventspils of the Latvian-Estonian Basketball League.

Germany (2020-present) 
On July 30, 2020, he has signed with Hamburg Towers of Germany's Basketball Bundesliga.

On July 9, 2021, he left the German team Hamburg Towers. On July 28, Shorts signed with the Crailsheim Merlins.

On June 11, 2022, the Crailsheim Merlins announced, that Shorts is looking for a new challenge for the 2022/2023 season.

On June 22, 2022, he signed with Telekom Baskets Bonn of the German Basketball Bundesliga.

National team 
On October 31st, 2022, Shorts was added to the roster of North Macedonia's men's national basketball team.

References

External links
UC Davis Aggies bio

Living people
American expatriate basketball people in Estonia 
American men's basketball players 
Basketball players from California
BK Ventspils players
Crailsheim Merlins players
Hamburg Towers players
Macedonian people of American descent
People from Tustin, California
Point guards
Saddleback Gauchos men's basketball players
Sportspeople from Orange County, California
Telekom Baskets Bonn players
UC Davis Aggies men's basketball players
1997 births